A set may refer to:
 Sydney Trains A set, a type of train
 List of poker hands#Three of a kind